In ancient Greek costume, a tainia (pl:  or ; pl: taeniae) was a headband, ribbon, or fillet.

The tainia headband was worn with the traditional ancient Greek costume. The headbands were worn at Greek festivals. The gods also bound their heads with tainiai. Furthermore, cult images, trees, urns, monuments, animal sacrifices and the deceased had tainiai wound around them. They were later adopted by the Romans. A similar type of headband was the diadema, used as a symbol for kings.

See also
 Fillet (clothing)
 Wreath (attire)
 Clothing in ancient Greece

References

External links

 Image of a woman wearing a chiton and a broad taenia at Perseus Project

Greek clothing
Headgear
Crowns (headgear)